Richard Miller may refer to:

Artists and academics
Dick Miller (1928–2019), American character actor
Richard C. Miller (1912–2010), American photographer
Richard E. Miller (1875–1943), American Impressionist painter
Richard J. Miller (1923–2008), sculptor, printmaker and painter
Richard Louis Miller (born 1939), American clinical psychologist
Richard N. Miller, American doctor
Richard Miller (engineer), first president of Olin College
Richard Miller (psychologist) (born 1948), American psychologist and Yogic scholar
Richard Miller (singer) (1926–2009), American operatic tenor, professor of singing at Oberlin College and author
Richard Miller (visual effects) (1942–2022), American sculptor and visual effects artist
Richard W. Miller, American philosopher
Rick Miller (comedian) (born 1978), Canadian comedian and presenter of the US TV series Just for Laughs

Politicians
Richard Miller (Oregon politician), member of the Oregon Territorial Legislature, 1850
Richard L. Miller (1907–1983), member of the West Virginia House of Delegates
Richard P. Miller Jr. (died 2014), mayor of Oneonta, New York and President of Hartwick College
V. Richard Miller (1939–2016), American politician
Rick Miller (Canadian politician) (1960–2013), Alberta politician
Rick Miller (Texas politician) (born 1945), retired United States Navy officer and Republican politician

Sports figures
Dick Miller (athlete) (born 1929), British athlete
Dick Miller (basketball) (1958–2014), American professional basketball player
Rich Miller (baseball) (born 1951), American minor league baseball player and manager
Rick Miller (baseball) (born 1948), American Major League Baseball player
Rick Miller (speedway rider) (born 1961), former American international motorcycle speedway rider

Other people
Richard Miller (agent) (1937–2013), American FBI agent arrested for spying in 1984
Richard Miller, engineer and businessman who founded VM Labs
Rich Miller, Illinois political journalist, columnist and founder of Capitol Fax

Characters
Dick Miller, a character in the 1933 film Air Hostess
Richard "Dick" Miller, a character in the 1935 film Ah, Wilderness!
Richard Miller, a recurring character in the Sniper film series
Richard Miller, the main character in the games Time Crisis (1995) and Time Crisis: Project Titan (2001)